The La Tondeña strike was a protest action that happened in October 1975, notable for being the first major strike to be held after Ferdinand Marcos' 1972 declaration of martial law in the Philippines. It is also considered as one of the first major open acts of resistance against the Marcos dictatorship and an important turning point for the period. 

The strike began on October 24 when 500 workers, organizing themselves as the Kaisahan ng Malayang Manggagawa ng La Tondeña Inc. (Union of Free Workers of La Tondeña), stopped work and barricaded themselves in the facilities of La Tondeña, then the largest distillery in Asia. Their demands included the elevation of casual workers to permanent status, maternity leave for female workers, and an end to illegal firings. It ended 44 hours later when Marcos' forces cracked down on the protesters, including various Catholic religious workers who had decided to support the protester's cause.

The strike was originally possible under the rules of Martial Law because La Tondeña was not considered a critical industry, so Marcos eventually responded by proclaiming a decree that outlawed all strikes across all industries.

As stories of the La Tondeña strike spread, the event became a symbol of resistance.

Labor rights activist Edgar Jopson played a key role in organizing the protest, among other things coining the protest phrase "Sobra na! Tama na! Welga na!" (lit. It's too much already! Enough! Time to strike!). The slogan would become a popular catchphrase used by the labor protest movement until the ousting of Ferdinand Marcos during the 1986 People Power revolution more than a decade later.

Another organizer of the strike was labor leader Eliseo "Elsie" Estares, who was later recognized by Kilusang Mayo Uno with a Gawad Lingkod Obrero for his heroism and contributions to the labor movement.

The strike received support from the religious sector, and was backed by such leaders as Father Joe Dizon and Sister Mary John Mananzan.

See also 
 Timeline of the Marcos Dictatorship
 Workers' resistance against the Marcos dictatorship
 Religious sector resistance against the Marcos dictatorship

References 

1975 in the Philippines
History of Manila
Presidency of Ferdinand Marcos
1975 labor disputes and strikes
Labor disputes in the Philippines